Abbreviation ICNB may refer to: 

Institute for Nature Conservation and Biodiversity, a Portuguese government agency
International Code of Nomenclature of Bacteria, a scientific classification
Intercostal nerve block, a medical procedure